In geometry, an icosahedron ( or ) is a polyhedron with 20 faces. The name comes . The plural can be either "icosahedra" or "icosahedrons".

There are infinitely many non-similar shapes of icosahedra, some of them being more symmetrical than others. The best known is the (convex, non-stellated) regular icosahedron—one of the Platonic solids—whose faces are 20 equilateral triangles.

Regular icosahedra

There are two objects, one convex and one nonconvex, that can both be called regular icosahedra. Each has 30 edges and 20 equilateral triangle faces with five meeting at each of its twelve vertices. Both have icosahedral symmetry. The term "regular icosahedron" generally refers to the convex variety, while the nonconvex form is called a great icosahedron.

Convex regular icosahedron

The convex regular icosahedron is usually referred to simply as the regular icosahedron, one of the five regular Platonic solids, and is represented by its Schläfli symbol {3, 5}, containing 20 triangular faces, with 5 faces meeting around each vertex.

Its dual polyhedron is the regular dodecahedron {5, 3} having three regular pentagonal faces around each vertex.

Great icosahedron

The great icosahedron is one of the four regular star Kepler-Poinsot polyhedra. Its Schläfli symbol is {3, }. Like the convex form, it also has 20 equilateral triangle faces, but its vertex figure is a pentagram rather than a pentagon, leading to geometrically intersecting faces. The intersections of the triangles do not represent new edges.

Its dual polyhedron is the great stellated dodecahedron {, 3}, having three regular star pentagonal faces around each vertex.

Stellated icosahedra
Stellation is the process of extending the faces or edges of a polyhedron until they meet to form a new polyhedron. It is done symmetrically so that the resulting figure retains the overall symmetry of the parent figure.

In their book The Fifty-Nine Icosahedra, Coxeter et al. enumerated 58 such stellations of the regular icosahedron.

Of these, many have a single face in each of the 20 face planes and so are also icosahedra. The great icosahedron is among them.

Other stellations have more than one face in each plane or form compounds of simpler polyhedra. These are not strictly icosahedra, although they are often referred to as such.

Pyritohedral symmetry

A regular icosahedron can be distorted or marked up as a lower pyritohedral symmetry, and is called a snub octahedron, snub tetratetrahedron, snub tetrahedron, and pseudo-icosahedron. This can be seen as an alternated truncated octahedron. If all the triangles are equilateral, the symmetry can also be distinguished by colouring the 8 and 12 triangle sets differently.

Pyritohedral symmetry has the symbol (3*2), [3+,4], with order 24. Tetrahedral symmetry has the symbol (332), [3,3]+, with order 12. These lower symmetries allow geometric distortions from 20 equilateral triangular faces, instead having 8 equilateral triangles and 12 congruent isosceles triangles.

These symmetries offer Coxeter diagrams:  and  respectively, each representing the lower symmetry to the regular icosahedron , (*532), [5,3] icosahedral symmetry of order 120.

Cartesian coordinates

The coordinates of the 12 vertices can be defined by the vectors defined by all the possible cyclic permutations and sign-flips of coordinates of the form (2, 1, 0). These coordinates represent the truncated octahedron with alternated vertices deleted.

This construction is called a snub tetrahedron in its regular icosahedron form, generated by the same operations carried out starting with the vector (ϕ, 1, 0), where ϕ is the golden ratio.

Jessen's icosahedron

In Jessen's icosahedron, sometimes called Jessen's orthogonal icosahedron, the 12 isosceles faces are arranged differently so that the figure is non-convex and has right dihedral angles.

It is scissors congruent to a cube, meaning that it can be sliced into smaller polyhedral pieces that can be rearranged to form a solid cube.

Cuboctahedron

A regular icosahedron is topologically identical to a cuboctahedron with its 6 square faces bisected on diagonals with pyritohedral symmetry. The icosahedra with pyritohedral symmetry constitute an infinite family of polyhedra which include the cuboctahedron, regular icosahedron, Jessen's icosahedron, and double cover octahedron. Cyclical kinematic transformations among the members of this family exist.

Other icosahedra

Rhombic icosahedron

The rhombic icosahedron is a zonohedron made up of 20 congruent rhombs. It can be derived from the rhombic triacontahedron by removing 10 middle faces. Even though all the faces are congruent, the rhombic icosahedron is not face-transitive.

Pyramid and prism symmetries
Common icosahedra with pyramid and prism symmetries include:
19-sided pyramid (plus 1 base = 20).
18-sided prism (plus 2 ends = 20).
9-sided antiprism (2 sets of 9 sides + 2 ends = 20).
10-sided bipyramid (2 sets of 10 sides = 20).
10-sided trapezohedron (2 sets of 10 sides = 20).

Johnson solids
Several Johnson solids are icosahedra:

See also 
 600-cell
 Icosoku

References

Geodesic polyhedra
Individual graphs